Caribou Coffee Company is an American coffee company and coffeehouse chain. It was founded in Edina, Minnesota, in 1992. As of May 2015, the company operates 603 locations worldwide. It is headquartered in Brooklyn Center, Minnesota.

Background
Caribou Coffee founder John Puckett was working as a management consultant for Boston-based firm Bain & Company, helping develop ideas and strategies for other companies, when he decided he wanted to become an entrepreneur. After a trip to Denali National Park in Alaska, he and his wife, Kim, decided to raise money and start a coffee company. His wife stayed with a job at General Motors while John moved to Minnesota to find the first site and put together financing.

The initial concept for Caribou was a five-day-a-week schedule aimed at downtown office workers, mimicking what worked in Boston. Puckett signed a lease for the first location to be in the large Pillsbury Center office building. However, soon afterward the building's landlord decided not to sign the lease, because another of the building's retail tenants had exclusive rights to selling coffee in the building and had threatened to sue them. As a result, the financing for the store fell through because it was dependent on that specific site. Puckett opted to start looking for an available location in the suburbs, and the first Caribou Coffee shop was started in Edina, Minnesota, a suburb of Minneapolis, in December 1992.

In 2003, Michael J. Coles was named CEO.

On September 29, 2005, Caribou launched its IPO listed on NASDAQ under CBOU. CEO Coles recalls: "Two years after I took over, we expanded to 337 stores in fourteen states and the District of Columbia. In less than three years, Caribou went from a company with negative sales growth to a public company listed on NASDAQ."

In 2006, Arcapita (formerly known as First Islamic Investment Bank) was Caribou Coffee's majority shareholder. In 2002, Yusuf al-Qaradawi's involvement with the bank led to a protest of Caribou Coffee. That same year al-Qaradawi stepped down as chairman of the bank's Sharia Board.

As of 2009, Caribou employed more than 6,000 people.

In December 2012, the company was taken private in a $340 million deal by German equity company JAB Holding Company.
Following the merger, it was stated that Caribou Coffee would continue to be operated as an independent company with its own brand, management team and growth strategy, and that Caribou would continue to be based in Minneapolis.
 
In May 2013, Caribou Coffee announced plans to close 80 stores in Ohio, Michigan, Pennsylvania, Washington D.C., Maryland, Virginia, Georgia, Illinois and Eastern Wisconsin, with 88 others in those locations to be converted to Peet's Coffee & Tea during 2013–2014. Caribou locations would remain open in California, Colorado, Georgia, Iowa, Illinois, Indiana, Kansas, Michigan, Minnesota, Missouri, North Carolina, North Dakota, Nebraska, Ohio, Oklahoma, South Dakota, Virginia, Wisconsin, Wyoming, and ten international markets.

Caribou Coffee has 282 franchised outlets across nine international markets, including Kuwait, Qatar, Saudi Arabia, Turkey and the United Arab Emirates. 

In 2019, John Butcher replaced Sarah Spiegel as CEO.

On August 5, 2021, Caribou announced that it had merged with Panera Bread and Einstein Bros. Bagels to form Panera Brands. After four years in private hands, on November 8, 2021, Panera Brands filed paperwork for an initial public offering of stock.

Data breach
On December 20, 2018, the company notified its customers of a potential data breach that they discovered in late November of that year. The breach also affected other companies owned by JAB Holding Company, namely Bruegger's and Einstein Bros. Bagels, and included the release of credit card numbers and CVV codes.

See also 

List of coffeehouse chains

References

External links

 

Coffeehouses and cafés in the United States
Companies based in Minneapolis
American companies established in 1992
Food and drink companies established in 1992
Restaurants established in 1992
1992 establishments in Minnesota
Coffee brands
Restaurant franchises
2013 mergers and acquisitions
Data breaches in the United States